Denham Jephson (1748? –  9 May 1813), of Mallow Castle, co. Cork, was a Member of Parliament for Mallow in 1802–1812.

References

1748 births
1813 deaths
Politicians from County Cork
People from Mallow, County Cork
Year of birth uncertain
Date of death missing
Place of death missing
UK MPs 1802–1806
UK MPs 1806–1807
UK MPs 1807–1812